Pronomeuta sarcopis is a moth in the family Yponomeutidae. It was described by Edward Meyrick in 1905 from Sri Lanka.

The wingspan is 15–18 mm. The forewings are light fuscous or fuscous-ochreous, irregularly strewn with small dark fuscous dots. The discal stigmata are rather large and dark fuscous. The hindwings are dull fuscous-reddish.

The larvae are known to attack Hydnocarpus wightiana.

References

Moths described in 1905
Yponomeutidae